The 2012–2013 St. Francis Terriers men's basketball team represented St. Francis College during the 2012–13 NCAA Division I men's basketball season. The team was led by third year head coach Glenn Braica, who is the reigning NEC head coach of the year. The Terrier's home games were played at the  Generoso Pope Athletic Complex. They also played 2 games at the new Barclays Center in Downtown Brooklyn against Long Island in a neutral site match up and St. John's in the inaugural Brooklyn Hoops Winter Festival. The team has been a member of the Northeast Conference since 1981.  They finished the season at 12–18 overall and 8–10 in the NEC to finish in eighth place, which qualified them for the NEC Basketball Tournament. They lost in the quarterfinals of the Northeast Conference Basketball tournament to number one seed Robert Morris.

Season outlook
In Glenn Braica's first two seasons the Terriers have made the NEC tournament. Going into this season Braica has a combined 30–30 record and is coming off of winning the 2012 NEC Coach of the Year Trophy. Last year the Terriers earned the fourth seed in the conference and hosted their first home playoff game since 1997. For the 2012–2013 season, Braica's Terriers were selected to finish fifth by the Northeast Conference men's basketball coaches. The Terriers had four of their five starters returning for the season. The only loss in the starting five was swingman and three-point specialist Stefan Perunicic.
Perunicic is the program's second-leading three-point shooter of all-time. The Terriers also lost guard Justin Newton to graduation. Yet the Terriers saw the return of former starting guard Dre Calloway, who missed most of last season after having season-ending shoulder surgery in November 2011.

The Terriers returned four starters: Jalen Cannon, Akeem Johnson, Brent Jones and Ben Mockford. Power forward Jalen Cannon was selected to the 2012 NEC All-Rookie team and led the team in rebounding with 8.8 per game. Cannon also recorded 8 double-doubles. Forward-center Akeem Johnson had 3 20+ point games and started 26 out of 30 games. Johnson was also one of the more efficient players in the Northeast Conference with a 55% field goal mark. Point guard Brent Jones was last year's assists leader, averaging 3.9 per game. Jones took over the starting job down the stretch last year, starting 12 of the last 13 contests. Shooting guard Ben Mockford led the team in scoring with 11.8 points per game and started all 30 contests last year.

Preseason signings
The Terriers announced that 6 ft 3 in combo guard Anthony White (Mastic, New York) and 6'4" shooting guard Aleksandar Isailovic (Belgrade, Serbia) had signed National Letters-of-Intent to enroll at the college in fall 2012. Anthony White came from William Floyd High School, where in his junior year he led his team in points, rebounds and assists. White was also an All-League selection, All-Conference, All-Suffolk County and was selected to the Newsday All-Long Island Team. Aleksander Isailovic is arriving from Collin College in Plano, Texas. Isailovic averaged 10.5 points, 2.7 rebounds, and 0.7 steals per game last season at Collin Community College and will have two years of eligibility as a Terrier.

Regular season
For the second season in a row the Terriers opened their season mostly on the road, as they played 8 of their first 11 games away from The Pope. The Terriers completed the non-conference portion of their schedule at 4–7. The team won the season opener against Lafayette on the road, with four of the five Terrier starters scoring double digits. Jalen Cannon notched his first double-double of the season with 13 points and 13 rebounds and the Terriers led by a much as 17 on their way to a 76–65 win. The Terriers snapped a three-game losing streak against the Leopards and also won for the first time on opening night since November 9, 2007. The Terriers then lost to Illinois 64–89. The Illini were the Terriers most difficult opponent all year long, they went on to be ranked as high as 10th in the nation by the AP and Coaches Polls. The Terriers home opener at The Pope was against Army, the game saw the Terriers defeated 59–67. The Terriers closed the first half down by one point, 30–31, yet they never led in the second half as the Black Knights soundly defeated the Terriers. Jalen Cannon scored a career-high 23 points and grabbed 10 rebounds and classmate Kevin Douglas added 15 points and rejected a career-high three shots in the losing effort. The Terriers then traveled to Rhode Island to play at Brown, where they beat the Bears 76–72 in overtime. Mockford scored 8 of his 14 points in overtime to lead the Terriers in the victory. After a 2–2 start, the Terriers went on to lose 5 straight games against Norfolk State, Albany, Boston College, Stony Brook and St. John's. Against both Norfolk State and Boston College the Terriers had second-half leads of 11 and 9 points respectively, but in both cases were unable to hold on for the win. Against Albany, Stony Brook and St. John's, the Terriers were soundly defeated. The Terriers then won their last two non-conference games against Colgate and NJIT. The game against Colgate saw Jalen Cannon drop 24 points, a new career high, and Travis Nichols 20 points off the bench. At NJIT, Johnson had the game-winning layup with five seconds remaining and Cannon put up 23 points and grabbed 12 rebounds for his 5th double-double of the season.

The Terriers then beat Quinnipiac, to extend their winning streak to three games and win their first game of the conference schedule. The Terriers went on to finish conference play at 8–10 and qualify for the NEC tournament with the 8th seed. Their next game, at Sacred Heart, saw the Terriers lose in the final seconds of the contest 65–66, even though Cannon poured in 20 points and grabbed 16 rebounds for his 6th double-double. Against Mount St. Mary's the Terriers were led by Ben Mockford's 19 point performance to win 70–56. In that game 4 Terriers were in double figures for points scored. At Wagner, the Terriers who were underdogs beat the Seahawks by 19 points, 71–52. For the first time all season Coach Braica had to change his starting 5 by starting Aleksandar Isailovic in place of Kevin Douglas, who has an injured right hand. Travis Nichols came off the bench to score 20 points and grab 6 rebounds, which contributed to the Seahawks first loss at home this season. After the Terriers opened conference play at 3–1, they went on to go 5–9 in their next 14 contest. The Terriers lost 2 games a piece to Monmouth and Long Island, including the Battle of Brooklyn game. Down the stretch Mockford scored a career high 29 points against Mount St. Mary's and Kevin Douglas did not return to the line-up until the last game of the regular season against Sacred Heart. St. Francis Brooklyn has struggled closing out games this season. The Terriers have held a second-half lead in 22 of their 27 contests this season (exceptions are Illinois, Army, St. John's, Stony Brook, and Mount St. Mary's). St. Francis has held a second-half lead in 16 of 18 NEC contests but are just 8–10.

NEC tournament
The 8th-seed Terriers traveled to 1st seed Robert Morris and lost 57–75; they were led by sophomore Jalen Cannon (15 points, 6 rebs).

Roster

Depth chart

Schedule and results

|-
!colspan=12 style="background:#0038A8; border: 2px solid #CE1126;;color:white;"| Non-conference regular season

|-
!colspan=12 style="background:#0038A8; border: 2px solid #CE1126;;color:white;"| NEC regular season

|-
!colspan=12 style="background:#0038A8; border: 2px solid #CE1126;;color:white;"| 2013 NEC Tournament

|-

Season statistics

Awards and honors
 Jalen Cannon
 College Sports Madness 2012–2013 Northeast Preseason All-Conference Fourth Team.
 Choice Hotels NEC Player of the Week award (December 24–30, 2012). Cannon guided the Terriers to back-to-back wins against NJIT and Colgate by averaging 23.5 points and 9.0 rebounds.
 All NEC-second team honors

Akeem Johnson
 College Sports Madness 2012–2013 Northeast Preseason All-Conference Second Team.

Travis Nichols
 College Sports Madness Mid-Major Conference Players of the Week award (January 7–13, 2013). Nichols paced the Terriers with 20 points off the bench at Wagner on 7-of-15 shooting, including 4-for-9 from 3-point range. Nichols also added 10 points and 9 rebounds versus Mount St. Mary's. Nichols has been in double-figures in four of his last six contests and is averaging 12.0 points in just 20.3 minutes per game during the stretch.

See also
 2012–13 St. Francis Brooklyn Terriers women's basketball team

References

St. Francis Brooklyn Terriers men's basketball seasons
St. Francis
St. Francis Brooklyn Terriers men's b
St. Francis Brooklyn Terriers men's b